Burunçayır is a village in the Besni District, Adıyaman Province, Turkey. Its population is 513 (2021).

References

Villages in Besni District